The Garland Vampire is an Australian amateur-built aircraft that is derived from the Sadler Vampire and was produced by Garland Aerospace of Camden, New South Wales. When it was available the aircraft was supplied as a kit for amateur construction or as a complete ready-to-fly-aircraft.

The company seems to have been founded about 2013 and gone out of business in 2016 and production ended.

Design and development
The Vampire features a cantilever mid-wing, a single-seat cockpit under a bubble canopy, fixed tricycle landing gear and a single engine in pusher configuration, with a twin-boom tail.

The aircraft is of mixed construction, with the wings, tail and tail-booms made from aluminum and the fuselage cockpit pod and wingtips from fibreglass. The aircraft can have its wings removed and be ready for ground trailer transport in 10 minutes, without the need to disconnect the flying controls.

Variants
Vampire GA-1
The standard engine used is the  Aixro XF-40  four-stroke Wankel engine.
Vampire GA-2
An updated model of the original SV-2 for the homebuilt market. The standard engine used is the  HKS 700E four-stroke powerplant.
Vampire GA-3
This higher-powered model incorporates Kevlar in the cockpit pod construction. The standard engine used is the  HKS 700E four-stroke powerplant.

Specifications (GA-3)

References

External links
Official website archives on Archive.org

Vampire
Single-engined pusher aircraft
Mid-wing aircraft
Homebuilt aircraft